The Chicago Varnish Company Building is a building built in 1895 as the headquarters of one of the leading varnish manufacturers in the United States, the Chicago Varnish Company. The building is a rare example of Dutch Renaissance Revival-style architecture in Chicago, and is marked by a steeply pitched roof paired with stepped gables of red brick and light stone in contrasting colors. The building was designed by Henry Ives Cobb, a nationally recognized architect whose other significant works include the former Chicago Historical Society Building, the Newberry Library, and the original buildings for the University of Chicago campus.  The building was listed on the National Register of Historic Places on June 14, 2001, and was designated a Chicago Landmark on July 25, 2001.

After an extensive rehabilitation, including replacement of the multigabled clay tile roof and rebuilding the stepped parapets, Harry Caray's Italian Steakhouse opened in the building on October 23, 1987.  The restaurant has received numerous awards for its food and service, and features many items of memorabilia, including a "Holy Cow" wearing the trademark Harry Caray eyeglasses that was sourced from Chicago's CowParade.

The building is distinctive for its use of the Dutch Renaissance revival style, with its stepped gables, steeply-pitched tile roof, and contrasting brick and stone masonry.

See also
Chicago Landmark

References

External links
Chicago Varnish Company Building

Commercial buildings on the National Register of Historic Places in Chicago
Chicago Landmarks
Office buildings completed in 1895
Stepped gables